Church of the Holy Archangel(s) or Church of the Holy Archangel(s) and other variants may refer to:

Armenia
Church of the Holy Archangels, Vagharshapat

Azerbaijan
Church of Michael the Archangel, Baku

Bulgaria
Church of the Holy Archangels Michael and Gabriel, Nesebar

France

Georgia
Ikorta Church of the Archangel

Israel
Church of the Holy Archangels, Jerusalem (Armenian)

Poland
Church of the Archangel Michael, Warsaw

Romania
Church of the Holy Archangels, Blaj
Church of the Holy Archangels Michael and Gabriel, Brăila
Churches of the Holy Archangels, Carei
Church of the Holy Archangels, Focșani
Church of the Holy Archangels (Stamatinești), Focșani
Church of the Holy Archangels, Pașcani
Church of the Archangels Michael and Gabriel, Plopiș
Church of the Holy Archangels, Rogoz
Church of the Holy Archangels, Satulung
Church of the Archangels Michael and Gabriel, Șurdești
Church of the Holy Archangels, Târgu Jiu

Ukraine
Church of the Archangel Michael, Uzhok